Greatest Hits on Earth is a greatest hits compilation by The 5th Dimension, released in 1972. Consisting of charted singles from both Soul City and Bell labels, it spent 24 weeks on the chart and peaked at #14.

In December 1972 the album was certified Gold by the RIAA.

Track listing

Side 1
"(Last Night) I Didn't Get to Sleep at All" – 3:12
"Stoned Soul Picnic" – 3:23
"One Less Bell to Answer" – 3:29
"Medley: Aquarius/Let the Sunshine In (The Flesh Failures)" – 4:49
"Wedding Bell Blues" - 2:42

Side 2
"Save the Country" - 2:39
"Love's Lines, Angles and Rhymes (song)" – 3:57
"Puppet Man" – 2:58
"Up, Up and Away" – 2:40
"Never My Love" – 3:55
"Together Let's Find Love" – 3:30

References

1972 greatest hits albums
The 5th Dimension albums
Bell Records compilation albums
Albums produced by Bones Howe